Pharsalia antennata is a species of beetle in the family Cerambycidae. It was described by Charles Joseph Gahan in 1895. It is known from India, China, Myanmar, and Laos.

References

antennata
Beetles described in 1895